My Heart is a Jazz Band (German: Mein Herz ist eine Jazzband) is a 1929 German silent drama film directed by Frederic Zelnik and starring Lya Mara, Raimondo Van Riel and Heinrich Gotho. The film's art direction was by Andrej Andrejew. It premiered on 28 January 1929. It shares its title with a popular 1920s song of the same name.

Cast
Lya Mara as Jessie 
Raimondo Van Riel as Jack 
Heinrich Gotho as Reggie 
Charles Puffy as Odyddeus 
Bobby Burns as Bobby 
Karl Harbacher as Worvester 
Lydia Potechina as Miss Betta 
Hermann Böttcher as Stanfield 
Michael von Newlinsky as Johnson 
Alfred Abel as Gellony 
Carl Goetz as Little Nick 
Ivan Koval-Samborsky as Jerry

References

External links

Films of the Weimar Republic
1929 drama films
German silent feature films
German drama films
Films directed by Frederic Zelnik
German black-and-white films
Silent drama films
1920s German films